The vitelline veins are veins that drain blood from the yolk sac and the gut tube during gestation.

Path
They run upward at first in front, and subsequently on either side of the intestinal canal. They unite on the ventral aspect of the canal.

Beyond this, they are connected to one another by two anastomotic branches, one on the dorsal, and the other on the ventral aspect of the duodenal portion of the intestine. This is encircled by two venous rings; into the middle or dorsal anastomosis the superior mesenteric vein opens.

The portions of the veins above the upper ring become interrupted by the developing liver and broken up by it into a plexus of small capillary-like vessels termed sinusoids.

Derivatives

The vitelline veins give rise to:
 Hepatic veins
 Inferior portion of Inferior vena cava
 Portal vein
 Superior mesenteric vein
 Inferior mesenteric vein

The branches conveying the blood to the plexus are named the venae advehentes, and become the branches of the portal vein. The vessels draining the plexus into the sinus venosus are termed the venae revehentes, and form the future hepatic veins. Ultimately the left vena revehens no longer communicates directly with the sinus venosus, but opens into the right vena revehens. The persistent part of the upper venous ring, above the opening of the superior mesenteric vein, forms the trunk of the portal vein.

Function 
The vitelline veins drain the yolk sac during early embryonic development. They also drain the gut tube in embryos once this has formed from the yolk sac.

Additional images

References

External links
 
 
 

Embryology of cardiovascular system